The All-Liga ACB Team is an award for the top-tier professional basketball league in Spain, the Spanish ACB League. It is the yearly selection of the league's top 10 basketball players by position. The award began with the 2003–04 season. The award is voted on by coaches, players, fans (through online voting), and the media.

All-Liga ACB Team by season

Player nationalities by national team.

See also
ACB Most Valuable Player Award
ACB Finals Most Valuable Player Award
ACB Rising Star Award

References

External links
Spanish League Official Website 

Liga ACB players
Liga ACB awards